Football at the 1930 Far Eastern Games, held in Tokyo, Japan was won by China.

Teams

Results

Winner

Statistics

Goalscorers

Notes

References

1930 in Japanese football
Football at the Far Eastern Championship Games
International association football competitions hosted by Japan
1930 in Asian football